Hanna Leonidivna Dzerkal (Ганна Леонідівна Дзеркаль, also spelled Ganna Dzerkal; born 18 August 1987 in Yuzhnoukrainsk) is a Ukrainian swimmer who competes in the Women's 200m and 400m individual medley, the women's 200m Breaststroke, and the 4 × 200 m freestyle relay. At the 2012 Summer Olympics she finished 26th overall in the heats in the Women's 400 metre individual medley and failed to reach the final. In the 200 metre medley she won her heat.  She finished in 17th in the 200 m breaststroke and helped the Ukrainian team reach 16th in the 4 × 200 m freestyle event.

References

Ukrainian female swimmers
1987 births
Living people
People from Yuzhnoukrainsk
Olympic swimmers of Ukraine
Swimmers at the 2008 Summer Olympics
Swimmers at the 2012 Summer Olympics
Female medley swimmers
Female breaststroke swimmers
Sportspeople from Mykolaiv Oblast
21st-century Ukrainian women